First Presbyterian Church of Rumson, also known as the First Presbyterian Church of Oceanic, is a historic church in Rumson, Monmouth County, New Jersey, United States.

It was built in 1885 and added to the National Register of Historic Places in 2010.

References

19th-century Presbyterian church buildings in the United States
Churches in Monmouth County, New Jersey
National Register of Historic Places in Monmouth County, New Jersey
Presbyterian churches in New Jersey
Churches on the National Register of Historic Places in New Jersey
Churches completed in 1885
Rumson, New Jersey
Shingle Style church buildings
New Jersey Register of Historic Places
Shingle Style architecture in New Jersey